The flow process chart is a graphical and symbolic representation of the activities performed on the work piece during the operation in industrial engineering.

History
The first structured method for documenting process flow, e.g., in flow shop scheduling, the flow process chart, was introduced by Frank and Lillian Gilbreth to members of ASME in 1921 as the presentation "Process Charts, First Steps in Finding the One Best Way to Do Work". The Gilbreths' tools quickly found their way into industrial engineering curricula. 
 
In the early 1930s, an industrial engineer, Allan H. Mogensen, began training business people in the use of some of the tools of industrial engineering at his Work Simplification Conferences in Lake Placid, New York. A 1944 graduate of Mogensen's class, Art Spinanger, took the tools back to Procter and Gamble, where he developed their Deliberate Methods Change Program. Another 1944 graduate, Ben S. Graham, Director of Formcraft Engineering at Standard Register Corporation, adapted the flow process chart to information processing with his development of the multi-flow process chart to display multiple documents and their relationships.

Symbols
In 1947, ASME adopted the following symbol set derived from Gilbreth's original work as the ASME Standard for Process Charts. 

 Operation: to change the physical or chemical characteristics of the material.
 Inspection: to check the quality or the quantity of the material.
 Move: transporting the material from one place to another.
 Delay: when material cannot go to the next activity.
 Storage: when the material is kept in a safe location.

When to use it

 It is used when observing a physical process, to record actions as they happen, and thus get an accurate description of the process.
 It is used when analyzing the steps in a process, to help identify and eliminate waste—thus, it is a tool for efficiency planning.
 It is used when the process is mostly sequential, containing few decisions.

See also
 Business process mapping
 Control flow diagram
 Data flow diagram
 Flowchart
 Functional flow block diagram
 Workflow

References

External links

Industrial engineering
Charts